Neissa occidentalis is a species of beetle in the family Cerambycidae. It was described by Breuning in 1974. It is known from Australia.

References

Lamiinae
Beetles described in 1974